Chipaya is a village in Bolivia located in the Sabaya Province (formerly Atahuallpa Province) of the Oruro Department. It is the seat of the Chipaya Municipality. In 2001 it had a population of 363. The village is situated in a remote area northeast of Lake Coipasa where the people have maintained special elements of their culture.

Chipaya was declared a National Monument by Supreme Decrete No. 8171 on December 7, 1967.

Climate

See also 
 Chipaya language
 Uru–Chipaya languages

References

Populated places in Oruro Department
Indigenous peoples in Bolivia
Tourist attractions in Oruro Department
Archaeological sites in Bolivia